Brandon is an unincorporated community in Benton County, Missouri, United States.

The community was named after the original owner of the town site.

References

Unincorporated communities in Benton County, Missouri
Unincorporated communities in Missouri